Low Moor may refer to:
 Low Moor, Bradford, England
Low Moor railway station
Low Moor Ironworks
Low Moor Explosion
Low Moor F.C., football club from Clitheroe, England
 Low Moor, Iowa, USA
 Low Moor, Lancashire, England
 Low Moor, New Jersey, USA
 Low Moor, Virginia, USA